Kiokio railway station was a flag station on the North Island Main Trunk in New Zealand.

By December 1896 there was a shelter shed, platform, cart approach and a crossing loop for 4 wagons. By December 1911 a loading bank had been added and the loop extended for 7 wagons. A 1963 report said the station building was built in 1887 and last painted in 1960. It closed to passengers on Monday, 9 June 1969 and to all traffic on Sunday, 28 November 1971. There is now just a single track through the station site and, apart from the name of the road, little sign that there was ever a station.

References

External links
 1931 derailment of 14 wagons about a mile north of Kiokio - report and photo
 CFG Heritage: Te Awamutu Reinforcement Project – archaeological assessment Figures 28 and 29 map and photo of  probable location of Kiokio goods shed

Defunct railway stations in New Zealand
Rail transport in Waikato
Buildings and structures in Waikato